Denis Noble  (born 16 November 1936) is a British biologist who held the Burdon Sanderson Chair of Cardiovascular Physiology at the University of Oxford from 1984 to 2004 and was appointed Professor Emeritus and co-Director of Computational Physiology. He is one of the pioneers of systems biology and developed the first viable mathematical model of the working heart in 1960.

Education
Noble was educated at Emanuel School and University College London (UCL). In 1958 he began his investigations into the mechanisms of heartbeat. This led to two seminal papers in Nature in 1960 giving the first experimentally-based mathematical simulation of the electrical rhythm of the heart, extensively developed with Richard Tsien in 1975, and with Dario DiFrancesco in 1985. All three articles form the foundations of modern electrophysiology of the heart. The 1985 article was included in 2015 in the Royal Society's 350 year celebration of the publication of Philosophical Transactions.

From this work it became clear that there was not a single oscillator which controlled heartbeat, but rather this was an emergent property of the feedback loops involving the various ion channels.  In 1961 he obtained his PhD working under the supervision of Otto Hutter at UCL.

Research
Noble's research focuses on using computer models of biological organs and organ systems to interpret function from the molecular level to the whole organism. Together with international collaborators, his team has used supercomputers to create the first virtual organ, the virtual heart.

As secretary-general of the International Union of Physiological Sciences 1993–2001, he played a major role in launching the Physiome Project, an international project to use computer simulations to create the quantitative physiological models necessary to interpret the genome, and he was elected president of the IUPS at its world congress in Kyoto in 2009.

Noble is also a philosopher of biology, with many publications in journals and books of philosophy.

His books The Music of Life and Dance to the Tune of Life challenge the foundations of current biological sciences, question the central dogma, its unidirectional view of information flow, and its imposition of a bottom-up methodology for research in the life sciences

Reductionism
His 2006 book The Music of Life examines some of the basic aspects of systems biology, and is critical of the ideas of genetic determinism and genetic reductionism.  He points out that there are many examples of feedback loops and "downward causation" in biology, and that it is not reasonable to privilege one level of understanding over all others.  He also explains that genes in fact work in groups and systems, so that the genome is more like a set of organ pipes than a "blueprint for life". His 2016 book Dance to the Tune of Life sets these ideas out in a broad sweep from the general principle of relativity applied to biology, through to the role of purpose in evolution and to the relativity of epistemology.

He contrasts Dawkins's famous statement in The Selfish Gene ("Now they [genes] swarm ... safe inside gigantic lumbering robots ... they created us, body and mind; and their preservation is the ultimate rationale for our existence") with an alternative view: "Now they [genes] are trapped in huge colonies, locked inside highly intelligent beings, moulded by the outside world, communicating with it by complex processes, through which, blindly, as if by magic, function emerges.  They are in you and me; we are the system that allows their code to be read; and their preservation is totally dependent on the joy we experience in reproducing ourselves.  We are the ultimate rationale for their existence".  He then suggests that there is no empirical difference between these statements, and says that they differ in "metaphor" and "sociological or polemical viewpoint".

He argues that "the paradigms for genetic causality in biological systems are seriously confused" and that "The metaphors that served us well during the molecular biological phase of recent decades have limited or even misleading impacts in the multilevel world of systems biology. New paradigms are needed if we are to succeed in unravelling multifactorial genetic causation at higher levels of physiological function and so to explain the phenomena that genetics was originally about."

Evolution

Noble has called for an extended evolutionary synthesis, and more controversially a replacement for the modern synthesis.

He has argued that from research in epigenetics, acquired characteristics can be inherited and in contrast to the modern synthesis, genetic change is "far from random" and not always gradual. He has also claimed that the central dogma of molecular biology has been broken as an "embodiment of the Weismann Barrier", and a new synthesis will integrate research from physiology with evolutionary biology.

Principles of Systems Biology

Noble has proposed Ten Principles of Systems Biology:
 Biological functionality is multi-level
 Transmission of information is not one way
 DNA is not the sole transmitter of inheritance
 The theory of biological relativity: there is no privileged level of causality
 Gene ontology will fail without higher-level insight
 There is no genetic program
 There are no programs at any other level
 There are no programs in the brain
 The self is not an object
 There are many more to be discovered; a genuine 'theory of biology' does not yet exist

Career
 1961–1963 – Assistant lecturer in Physiology, University College London
 1961–1963 – Vice-warden of Connaught Hall (University of London)
 1963–1984 – Fellow and tutor, Balliol College, Oxford. University Lecturer in Physiology
 From 1967 – Editor of Progress in Biophysics and Molecular Biology
 1969–1970 – Visiting professor and visiting scientist of the Canadian MRC
 1971–1989 – Head (praefectus) of the Balliol College Graduate Centre at Holywell Manor
 1975–1985 – Leader of MRC Programme Grant team
 1983–1985 – Vice-master of Balliol College
 1986 – co-founder of Save British Science, now the Campaign for Science and Engineering
 1984–2004 – Burdon Sanderson Professor of Cardiovascular Physiology, Oxford University
 1984–2004 – Professorial fellow, Balliol College
 From 2004 – Emeritus professor of Cardiovascular Physiology, Oxford University
 From 2004 – Emeritus fellow of Balliol College, Oxford
 From 2004 – Director of Computational Physiology, Oxford
 2003–2007 – Adjunct professor, Xi’an Jiaotong University, Shaanxi province, China
 From 2005 – Visiting professor, Osaka University, Japan
 2009–2017 – President, International Union of Physiological Sciences
 From 2009 – Co-founder and editor of Voices from Oxford
 2011–2017 – Editor in chief of Interface Focus
 From 2014 – Member and co-founder of The Third Way of Evolution
 From 2021 - Co-Founder Oxford Longevity Project

Publications
Noble has published over 600 articles in academic journals, including Nature, Science, PNAS, Journal of Physiology, Progress in Biophysics & Molecular Biology; Many articles in national press. He is the author or editor of many books, including:

 The Initiation of the Heartbeat (OUP, 1975, 1979 and Japanese translation), sole author; 
 Electric Current Flow in Excitable Cells OUP, 1975. With J.J.B.Jack & R.W.Tsien 
 Electrophysiology of Single Cardiac Cells, Academic Press 1987, with T Powell 
 Goals, No Goals and Own Goals, Unwin Hyman 1989, with Alan Montefiore, and author 
 Sodium-Calcium Exchange, OUP, 1989, with T.J.A. Allen and H. Reuter, and author 
 Ionic Channels and the Effect of Taurine on the Heart, Springer, 1993, 2013, with Y.E. Earm 
 The Logic of Life (OUP 1993), co-editor with CAR Boyd, and author; 
 The Ethics of Life (UNESCO 1997) co-editor with J-D Vincent; 
 The Music of Life, Biology beyond the genome OUP, 2006 (9 translations), sole author 
 Dance to the Tune of Life. Biological Relativity CUP, 2016, sole author 
 Exosomes: A Clinical Compendium Academic Press, 2019, co-editor, and author
 The Language of Symmetry Chapman & Hall, 2023, co-editor, and author

Awards and honours

His major invited lectures include the Darwin Lecture for the British Association in 1966, the Nahum Lecture at Yale in 1977 and the Ueda lecture at Tokyo University in 1985 and 1990.  He was President of the Medical Section of the British Science Association 1991–92. Many further invited lectures during his election as Secretary-General (1993-2001) and President (2009-2017) of  IUPS.

In 1979 he was elected a Fellow of the Royal Society. His nomination for the Royal Society reads: 

He was elected an Honorary Member of the Royal College of Physicians in 1988 and an Honorary Fellow in 1994, an Honorary Member of the American Physiological Society in 1996 and of the Physiological Society of Japan in 1998. In 1989 he was elected a Member of the Academia Europaea. In 1998, he also became a founding Fellow of the Academy of Medical Sciences. In 1998 he was awarded a CBE. In 2021 he was elected a Fellow of the IUPS Academy. In 2022 he was elected a Fellow of The Linnean Society (FLS)

He has honorary doctorates from the University of Sheffield (2004), the Université de Bordeaux (2005) and the University of Warwick (2008).

He is an Honorary Foreign Member of the Académie Royale de Médecine de Belgique (1993), of the Istituto Lombardo Accademia di Scienze e Lettere, and received the Pavlov Medal of the Russian Academy of Sciences (2004). In 2022 he was elected Foreign Member of the Russian Academy of Sciences and was also awarded the Lomonosov Gold Medal.

Personal life
He was born in London in 1936 to working-class tailors, George and Ethel Noble. As a teenager, he was trained as a Magician by a stage performer, Tommy Dee, who may have been a model for the famous TV magician, Tommy Cooper. 
He plays classical guitar and sings Occitan troubadour and folk songs (Oxford Trobadors). 

References

External links

1936 births
Living people
20th-century British biologists
Extended evolutionary synthesis
Systems biologists
British bioinformaticians
English agnostics
Fellows of Balliol College, Oxford
Fellows of the Royal Society
Fellows of the Academy of Medical Sciences (United Kingdom)
Academic staff of Osaka University
People educated at Emanuel School
Cardiac electrophysiologists
21st-century British biologists